Émile Baas (3 March 1906 – 4 June 1984) was a 20th-century French essayist.

Works (selection) 
1945: Réflexions sur le régionalisme, les Éditions Scouts de France, La Hutte, Lyon
1953: Introduction critique au marxisme : perspectives marxistes, perspectives chrétiennes, Alsatia, Colmar, (new edition, fully revised, of the booklet: L'Humanisme marxiste, by the same author, 1947)
1973: Situation de l'Alsace, Alsatia, Colmar (1945 text with an afterword by the author)

See also 
 Catholic Office of Information and Initiative for Europe

References

Bibliography 
 Monique Grandjonc, Le temps d'apprendre à vivre : 1939-1945. Une école normale alsacienne réfugiée en zone libre, L'Harmattan, 2004, (pp. 204–206) 
 Marcel Hirlemann, "Les obsèques de M. Émile Baas", in Église en Alsace, 1984, 7–8, (pp. 42–44)
 Pierre Marthelot, "Avec Émile Baas, l'Alsace perd un de ses sages", in La Croix, 6 July 1984, (p. 13)
 Eugène Philipps, "Émile Baas : la quête de vérité", in Réalites alsaciennes, 1985, (pp. 17–24) (supplement to  Friday 7 June 1985)

External links 
  Emile Baas, L'humanisme marxiste, Essai d'analyse critique, 1947 (note bibliographique) on Persée
 Émile Baas on Alsace-histoire.org
 Speech by Émile Baas's daughter with a picture

20th-century French essayists
French Roman Catholic writers
1906 births
People from Guebwiller
People from Alsace-Lorraine
1984 deaths